Kapai, officially the Municipality of Kapai (Maranao: Inged a Kapai), is a 4th class municipality in the province of Lanao del Sur, Philippines. According to the 2020 census, it has a population of 20,581 people.

Geography

Barangays
Kapai is politically subdivided into 20 barangays.

Climate

Demographics

Economy

References

External links
 Kapai Profile at the DTI Cities and Municipalities Competitive Index
 [ Philippine Standard Geographic Code]
 Philippine Census Information

Municipalities of Lanao del Sur